Joe Dirt is a 2001 American adventure comedy film, directed by Dennie Gordon (in her feature film directorial debut), starring David Spade, Dennis Miller, Christopher Walken, Adam Beach, Brian Thompson, Brittany Daniel, Jaime Pressly, Erik Per Sullivan, and Kid Rock. The film was written by Spade and Fred Wolf, and produced by Robert Simonds. The plot revolves around a "white trash" young man, Joe Dirt, who at first seems to be a "loser", a failure, an antihero. As he travels in search of his parents, his finer qualities are increasingly revealed. He ends up with a new "family" of close friends, people he has helped and who respect him. While critical reception was mostly negative, the film was a modest financial success. A sequel, Joe Dirt 2: Beautiful Loser, premiered on Crackle on July 16, 2015.

Plot

Joe Dirt, a janitor at a Los Angeles radio station, tells his life story via shock jock Zander Kelly's broadcast.

Joe reveals that as a baby he had a mullet wig installed because the top of his skull had never formed. At age 8, he was left behind by his parents and sister at the Grand Canyon and thus does not know his real surname. After growing up in a series of foster homes, Joe ran away until he arrived in Silvertown, a small town in the Pacific Northwest. There, he met Brandy and her dog, Charlie, and became a target for jealousy from Robby, the town bully.

After Brandy's alcoholic father shoots Charlie dead, Joe decides to try to find his parents. He details his adventures across the country including his friendship with Kickin' Wing, an unsuccessful Native American fireworks salesman. In Indiana, Joe has an encounter with a serial killer named Buffalo Bob, who is parodying the lotion scene from The Silence of the Lambs. This brings him unwanted attention from the media, but helps his search. In Louisiana at a high school, he was a janitor working with Clem Doore, a former mobster in the Witness Protection Program. Clem rescues students after a mustard gas explosion and informs the media Joe was the hero. While traveling on further he came across an alligator farm and met the owner Charlene. Looking to make money he was hired to be an Alligator wrangler for audiences. After one encounter with an Alligator in which he landed wrong, he had an epiphany about his little sister yelling at Joe about why his last name was Dirt and not his real surname Nunamaker. Upon realizing his real last name, this helps Joe discover the address of his old family home and he travels to Baton Rouge only to find that they moved away many years prior.

Listening to Joe's story, both Zander and the radio audience initially find him an object of scorn, but Joe's kindness and optimistic outlook on life win them over.

Eventually, Joe lands the janitorial job at the radio station, where he recounts how he gave up the search and returned to Silvertown to be with Brandy. However, Robby informed him that he and Brandy are getting married and that she found Joe's parents, but instructed him not to tell Joe. Zander calls Brandy to find out why, and she tells Joe his parents were killed the day they were at the Grand Canyon; she pleads with Joe to return to Silvertown. Upset by the news, Joe stays in Los Angeles.

Joe is unaware that he has become a media sensation, but he quickly discovers his newfound fame. An appearance on TRL results in a phone call from a woman claiming to be Joe's mother. Joe meets his parents and he discovers that they intentionally abandoned him, and that they only reconnected with him in order to boost their sales of clown figurines. Joe storms out, cutting ties with his parents. He intends to commit suicide, but Brandy arrives and finally admits that she lied to him about his parents being dead because she had to protect him from them and their greed after she found out what horrible people they were. Brandy expresses her love and convinces Joe to come home with her but he suffers a head injury after a police officer lassos and accidentally causes him to fall off a bridge hitting his head while springing back up.

Joe wakes up in Brandy's house, surrounded by his friends: Kickin' Wing, who reveals that thanks to Joe he now owns 30 successful firework stands, Clem (who is now under the name of Gert B. Frobe) and Charlene (now without a thumb and middle finger on her left hand), who are now engaged. Brandy reveals that she got Joe a dreadlock wig following his head operation, has retrieved his Hemi, and she has a new dog that Charlie fathered.

As they prepare to take a ride in Joe's Hemi, Robby arrives and tells Joe that no one wants him in Silvertown. Clem threatens Robby and exclaims that they are Joe's family. Robby challenges Joe to a race and Joe leaves him in the dust as Robby's car malfunctions and breaks down. As they drive away, Zander dedicates a song to Joe on the radio.

Cast

Soundtrack
 .38 Special – "Hold on Loosely" (1981)
 April Wine – "Roller" (1979)
 Argent – "Hold Your Head Up" (1972)
 Bachman–Turner Overdrive – "You Ain't Seen Nothing Yet" (1974)
 Bob Seger – "Ramblin' Gamblin' Man" (1973)
 Blue Öyster Cult – "Burnin' for You" (1981)
 Cheap Trick – "If You Want My Love" (1982)
 Dave Matthews Band – "Crash into Me" (1996)
 The Doobie Brothers – "Listen to the Music" (1972)/ "China Grove" (1973)
 Eddie Money – "Think I'm in Love" (1982)/ "Walk on Water" (1988)
 Foghat – "I Just Want to Make Love to You" (1972)
 George Clinton – "Atomic Dog" (1982)
 George Thorogood – "Who Do You Love?" (1978)/ "Bad to the Bone" (1982)
 James Gang – "Funk#49" (1971)
 Joe Walsh – "Rocky Mountain Way" (1973)
 Leif Garrett – "I Was Made for Dancin'" (1977)
 Lynyrd Skynyrd – "Sweet Home Alabama" (1974) / "That Smell" (1976)
 Sheriff – "When I'm with You" (1983, 1988)
 Thin Lizzy – "Jailbreak" (1976)
 Three Dog Night – "Shambala" (1973)
 Van Halen – "Everybody Wants Some" (1979)

Reception

Box office
Joe Dirt opened at #4 in the domestic box office with $8,016,008 and went on to gross $27,087,695 domestically and $3,900,000 in other territories for a worldwide total of $30,987,695; from an estimated $17.7 million budget; this can be considered a moderate success.

Critical response
On Metacritic the film has a rating of 20/100 based on reviews from 26 critics, indicating "generally unfavorable reviews". On Rotten Tomatoes, the film holds a 9% rating based on 76 reviews with an average rating of 3.1/10. The site's consensus reads, "If you fall within the target audience of Joe Dirt, you may find it funny. Otherwise, the jokes will seem like a tired retread." Audiences surveyed by CinemaScore gave the film a grade B−.

Ebert and Roeper both gave the film a thumbs down. Richard Roeper criticized the film for being too predictable and strained, and said that the radio station storyline was "absurd". Roger Ebert agreed, but praised Spade for taking on a different role than he is normally associated with, and added that Spade's performance was convincing, despite the film's other shortcomings. Ebert included Joe Dirt as one of his most hated films of all time under the category of "alleged comedies," stating that, "What movies, including Joe Dirt, often do not understand is that the act of being buried in crap is not in and of itself funny."

Cancelled TV series
In early 2010, Spade worked on a pilot with TBS for an animated series based on the film. The series never materialized.

Sequel

In 2014, Spade revealed in a Reddit question that he was writing a sequel to Joe Dirt for Crackle. Entertainment Weekly has noted that the film is "the first ever made-for-digital sequel". Filming on the sequel began on November 17, 2014, with David Spade posting a first look at Joe Dirt on his Instagram. The film was released in July 2015 and received similarly negative reviews.

References

External links

 
 
 
 
 

2001 films
2000s English-language films
2000s adventure comedy films
American adventure comedy films
Films directed by Dennie Gordon
Films produced by Robert Simonds
Films set in Los Angeles
Films shot in California
Films shot in Utah
Happy Madison Productions films
Columbia Pictures films
Fictional janitors
Films with screenplays by David Spade
Films with screenplays by Fred Wolf
2001 directorial debut films
2001 comedy films
2000s American films